Gehrlicher Solar AG is a German photovoltaics corporation with its registered office in Neustadt near Coburg and its administrative headquarters in Dornach near Munich. Gehrlicher Solar AG acts as a system integrator, planning, building, financing, maintaining and operating photovoltaic systems on open areas and roofs. In addition, the corporation acts as a wholesaler for solar modules, inverters and complete photovoltaic systems as well as offering its own developed components from the „GehrTec“ family of products.

History
Enersys Energiesysteme Gehrlicher was founded in 1994 by Gehrlicher’s CEO, Klaus Gehrlicher. At the time, the company’s fields of activities focused on photovoltaics, solar thermal energy and energy consulting. As of 1998, the company began concentrating its actitivities on increasingly larger photovoltaic on-grid systems. In 1999 all business activities were transferred to Gehrlicher Umweltschonende Energiesysteme GmbH. In 2004, Gehrlicher Solar Management GmbH was founded as an independent sister company. The company’s name was changed from Gehrlicher Umweltschonende Energiesysteme GmbH into Gehrlicher Solar AG in 2007. Due to a cooperation with the public utility, Stadtwerke München, the company began operating photovoltaic power plants in 2008.

Gehrlicher Solar AG had 430 employees at two sites in Germany – Neustadt near Coburg and Dornach near Munich. Furthermore, it operated subsidiaries in the following countries: Italy, Spain, Greece, France, Czech Republic, Slovakia, India, South Africa, Brazil and in the USA.

In 2013 banks terminated the credit line for the company and about 280 people lost their work. Gehrlicher Solar Services GmbH was founded in March 2014 for continuation of business.

Milestones
 2013: Gehrlicher Solar America Corp. sold to M+W Group 
 2010: Business activities were initiated in India, South Africa and Brazil
 2009: Gehrlicher Solar France SAS was founded in Paris and Gehrlicher Solar America Corp. was founded in New Jersey/USA
 2008: Gehrlicher Solar Hellas MEPE was founded in Athens and Gehrlicher Solar Italia s.r.l. was founded in Milan
 2007: Name of the company was changed to Gehrlicher Solar AG
 2005: Takeover of Gestión y Ahorro Energético S.L., which was founded in 2001
 2004: Gehrlicher Solar Management GmbH was founded
 2001: Gestión y Ahorro Energético S.L. was founded in Murcia/Spain
 1999: Activities were transferred to Gehrlicher Umweltschonende Energiesysteme GmbH
 1998: The first solar fund in Europe (Gehrlicher GmbH & Co. Solarpark 2000 KG) was founded
 1994: Enersys Energiesysteme Gehrlicher was founded by today‘s CEO, Klaus Gehrlicher

Awards
 2010: "Europe´s 500 Award", 21st place of the fastest growing European companies in terms of turnover and number of employees
 2010: Deloitte „Axia Award 2010 for Bavaria“ for Outstanding Innovation Culture
 2010: Sustained Excellence Award 2010 and Award in the "Technology Fast 50" competition organized by the accounting and consulting firm Deloitte
 2010: “Intersolar Award” for the development of a transport and mounting system for large modules
 2009: Award in the „Technology Fast 50“ competition organized by the accounting and consulting firm Deloitte
 2008 and 2010: Award in „Bavaria‘s Best 50“ competition organized by the Bavarian Ministry for Economy and the auditing firm Ernst & Young
 2004: German Solar Award for a roof-integrated thin-film system
 2002: Award in the "Electricity from solar facades“ organized by the Bavarian Chamber of Architects
 2000: Award in the "Innovative building-integrated solar electricity systems in Bavaria" competition organized by the Bavarian Chamber of Architects
 2000: „Environmental Energy Award“ from the city of Munich for the „Gehrlicher GmbH & Co. Solarpark 2000 KG“ solar fund

Projects (selection)

 2011: Construction of Langage Solar Park as part of Langage Energy Park in the southwest of England
 2010: Enlargement of  Solar Park Helmeringen, output is now 26.7 MWp (Lauingen Energy Park)
 2009: Construction of Solar Park Rothenburg (20,5 MWp)
 2008: Construction of Solar Park Helmeringen (Lauingen a. d. Donau) (10 MWp)
 2007: Commissioning of Spain’s largest CdTe thin-film system (5 MWp)
 2007: Construction of Solar Park Gundelfingen (2,7 MWp) and Salmdorf (1,0 MWp)
 2005: First open area with thin-film modules as investment model
 2004: EU project „PV Soundless“: At the time, Europe’s largest PV noise barrier
 2003: EU project „PV Enlargement“: Europe‘s largest module and inverter test field (Parking deck of the Munich Fair)

External links
 Website Gehrlicher Solar

References

Companies based in Bavaria
Solar energy companies of Germany